Sphenoraia is a genus of skeletonizing leaf beetles in the family Chrysomelidae. There are about 24 described species in Sphenoraia. They are found in Indomalaya and the Palaearctic.

Species
These 12 species are among those that belong to the genus Sphenoraia:

 Sphenoraia apicalis Kimoto & Takizawa, 1983
 Sphenoraia chujoi Lee, 2014
 Sphenoraia duodecimmaculata Jacoby, 1889
 Sphenoraia hopei Beenen, 2005
 Sphenoraia imitans Jacoby, 1892
 Sphenoraia intermedia Jacoby, 1885
 Sphenoraia javana (Wiedemann, 1819)
 Sphenoraia micans (Fairmair, 1888)
 Sphenoraia nebulosa (Gyllenhaal, 1808)
 Sphenoraia nigra Wang, Li & Yang, 2000
 Sphenoraia rutilans (Hope, 1831)

References

External links

 

Galerucinae
Chrysomelidae genera
Taxa named by Hamlet Clark